Kyokutenzan Takeshi (born August 4, 1973 as Batmönkhiin Enkhbat) is a former professional sumo wrestler from Ulaanbaatar, Mongolia, one of the first Mongolians to join the sport in Japan. He did not manage to reach the top two divisions, but was regarded as a kind of mentor and father figure by younger Mongolian wrestlers who followed him, such as Hakuhō and Harumafuji. In 2005, he obtained Japanese citizenship, but he left sumo upon his retirement in November 2007, moving to Germany with his family to run a business.

Career
Kyokutenzan joined sumo in March 1992 at the same time as his more famous Mongolian colleagues Kyokushūzan and Kyokutenhō, part of the first group of Mongolians ever to join the sport professionally, but unlike them he never reached sekitori status. This was due partly to an inability to put on weight, and partly to injuries. Nevertheless, he served as a tsukebito, or personal attendant, to Kyokutenhō, and was an importance influence on other Mongolian rikishi.  During his early days in sumo, when five of the six Mongolians in Ōshima stable ran away due to homesickness and the hardship of training, and sought refuge in the Mongolian embassy, Kyokutenzan was the only one who remained and he persuaded his countrymen to return. The importance of this action was recognized by Futagoyama Oyakata, the former ōzeki and father of Takanohana and Wakanohana, who commented that otherwise the subsequent line of successful Mongolian wrestlers in sumo might never have emerged.

During the January 2007 tournament Kyokutenzan attracted criticism over the amount of time he was spending in the two dressing rooms in which the wrestlers prepare for their bouts. He was interviewed by the Japan Sumo Association as part of their investigation of alleged match-fixing involving yokozuna Asashōryū. Kyokutenzan responded by saying he was just giving advice to Mongolian junior wrestlers, declaring, "I have never known of any match-fixing."

Kyokutenzan retired from professional sumo at the end of the 2007 Kyushu tournament. His retirement ceremony was held in December with Hakuhō and Asashōryū amongst the attendees as well as Kyokushūzan and Kyokutenhō. Kyuokutenzan moved to Germany with his wife, who he had married in July 2007, to start a business. His second child, a girl, was born in May 2008.

Career record

See also
Glossary of sumo terms
List of non-Japanese sumo wrestlers
List of past sumo wrestlers

References

External links
 

1973 births
Living people
Mongolian sumo wrestlers
Japanese sumo wrestlers
Japanese people of Mongolian descent
Naturalized citizens of Japan
Sportspeople from Ulaanbaatar